4 Arietis is a single star in the northern constellation of Aries, the ram. 4 Arietis is the Flamsteed designation. It is visible to the naked eye as a dim, blue-white hued star with an apparent visual magnitude of 5.86. It is moving further from the Earth with a heliocentric radial velocity of +6 km/s.

This is a B-type main sequence star with a stellar classification of B9.5 V. It is 257 million years old and is spinning with a projected rotational velocity of 33 km/s. The star has more than double the mass of the Sun and around 2.2 times the Sun's radius. It is radiating 40 times the Sun's luminosity from its photosphere at an effective temperature of 10,913 K.

References

External links
HR 522
Image 4 Arietis

B-type main-sequence stars
Aries (constellation)
Durchmusterung objects
Arietis, 04
010982
008387
0522